The Tall Men can refer to:

 The Tall Men (film)  (1955), starring Clark Gable
 "The Tall Men" (short story) (1941), by William Faulkner

See also 
 List of tallest people
 Ten Tall Men